Celypha rufana, common name lakes marble, is a small moth species of the family Tortricidae, long known under the junior synonym C. rosaceana.

Synonyms
Junior synonyms of this species are:
 Argyroploce rufana (Scopoli, 1763)
 Celypha rosaceana (Schläger, 1848)
 Euchromia arenana Laharpe, 1858
 Phalaena rufana Scopoli, 1763
 Sciaphila rosaceana Schläger, 1848
 Tortrix purpurana Haworth, [1811] (non Thunberg, 1784: preoccupied)
 Tortrix rosetana Hübner, [1796-1799]

Description
The wingspan is 15–19 mm. The basic color of the forewings is rosy or purplish (hence the Latin species name rosaceana, meaning pinkish) when the moth is freshly emerged, but it turns quickly to a dull buff tinge or a rufous coloration, with a lightly reticulated (net-like) pattern. Julius von Kennel provides a full description. 

These bivoltine moths fly during the afternoon and evening from May to July and in August and September.

The caterpillars feed in April and May mainly on the rootstock of sow thistles (Sonchus species) and common dandelion (Taraxacum officinale), but also on various other plants (Chrysanthemum leucanthemum, Artemisia vulgaris, Plantago, Achillea, etc.).  They have also been reported to be myrmecophilous.

Distribution and habitat
This species can be  found in most of Europe. It prefers rough ground, grassland and edges of woodlands.

References

  (2009): Online World Catalogue of the Tortricidae –  Celypha rufana.
  (1942): Eigenartige Geschmacksrichtungen bei Kleinschmetterlingsraupen ["Strange tastes among micromoth caterpillars"]. Zeitschrift des Wiener Entomologen-Vereins 27: 105-109 [in German]. PDF fulltext

External links

 Naturhistoriska risksmuseet
  Lepiforum.de

Olethreutini
Tortricidae of Europe
Moths described in 1763
Taxa named by Giovanni Antonio Scopoli